Marko Strahija (born 28 May 1975 in Zagreb) is a backstroke swimmer from Croatia, who competed at three Summer Olympics between 1996 and 2008.

Early career
Marko attended The Ohio State University and held university records in the 100 and 200 backstroke before the times were eclipsed by RJ Lemyre.

In Atlanta, United States, he finished in 11th position (B-Final) in the Men's 200 m backstroke, and was eliminated in the heats of the Men's 4 × 200 m freestyle relay, alongside Gordan Kožulj, Miroslav Vučetić, and Marijan Kanjer. Strahija won the silver medal, behind Aaron Peirsol of the United States, in the 200 m backstroke at the 2002 FINA Short Course World Championships.

Doping suspension and exoneration
Strahija's urine sample, taken in an out-of-competition control in July 2002, tested positive for human chorionic gonadotropin (hCG). Since hCG is a known tumor marker, Strahija underwent medical tests that found nothing suspicious. He maintained his innocence and disputed scientific validity of testing for hCG. Nevertheless, in 2003 he received a two-year suspension.

In October 2007 Strahija again tested positive for hCG, which caused him to miss the European Short Course Championships held in December that year. This time, subsequent medical tests found testicular cancer, and Strahija immediately underwent surgery. In February 2008, the International Swimming Federation exonerated Strahija, lifting his provisional suspension. He made a successful recovery, taking part in the 2008 Summer Olympics.

Olympic results

References

External links
 
 
 
 

1975 births
Living people
Male backstroke swimmers
Croatian male swimmers
Olympic swimmers of Croatia
Swimmers at the 1996 Summer Olympics
Swimmers at the 2000 Summer Olympics
Swimmers at the 2008 Summer Olympics
Swimmers from Zagreb
Croatian sportspeople in doping cases
Doping cases in swimming
Medalists at the FINA World Swimming Championships (25 m)
European Aquatics Championships medalists in swimming
Mediterranean Games gold medalists for Croatia
Mediterranean Games silver medalists for Croatia
Swimmers at the 2001 Mediterranean Games
Mediterranean Games medalists in swimming